Berhampore may refer to:

Baharampur, formerly known as Berhampore (also sometimes spelt Behrampore), a city of Murshidabad district, West Bengal, India
Baharampur, Bangladesh, a village in Patuakhali District in the Barisal Division of southern-central Bangladesh
Berhampore, New Zealand, a suburb of Wellington

See also
Brahmapur, Odisha, a city in Odisha, India
Brahmapur, Bihar, a city in Bihar, India